Cyperus celans is a species of sedge that is native to southern parts of Iran.

See also 
 List of Cyperus species

References 

celans
Plants described in 1995
Flora of Iran